Shunji Nakadome (born 17 August 1964) is a Japanese wrestler. He competed in the men's Greco-Roman 57 kg at the 1988 Summer Olympics.

References

1964 births
Living people
Japanese male sport wrestlers
Olympic wrestlers of Japan
Wrestlers at the 1988 Summer Olympics
Place of birth missing (living people)
Asian Games medalists in wrestling
Wrestlers at the 1986 Asian Games
Medalists at the 1986 Asian Games
Asian Games gold medalists for Japan
20th-century Japanese people
21st-century Japanese people